The City of Wellington by-election 1898 was held on 9 March 1898 to decide the next member of parliament for the  electorate. The contest was caused by resignation of Robert Stout and was won by former mayor of Wellington John Duthie.

Results

1896 election

 
 
 
 
 
 
 
 
 
 

1 Majority is difference between lowest winning poll (Fisher: 5,858) and highest losing poll (Atkinson: 5,830)

2 Turnout is total number of voters - as voters had three votes each total votes cast was higher (37,618)
)

1898 by-election

See also
1899 City of Wellington by-election

Notes

References

Wellington 1898
Politics of the Wellington Region
1898 elections in New Zealand
1890s in Wellington